Tim Bedore (born c. 1957) is an American comedian born in Chicago, IL.  His parents moved to Stevens Point, Wisconsin when he was a child.  He attended Pacelli High School (Wisconsin) in Stevens Point and the Appleton High School-West, where he graduated.

Bedore is best known for his Vague But True comedy segments on PRI's Marketplace and the syndicated Bob & Tom Show. Bedore gained initial fame doing an afternoon drive radio show at KQAK San Francisco.

After working for many years in the Los Angeles area, he recently moved to the Minneapolis-St. Paul area with his wife Karen and daughter Claire where he works from his home. His "Animal Conspiracy" threat continually surfaces in his on-air commentaries wherein an organized conspiracy of animals attack humans.  In addition to doing stand up comedy Tim also delivers a slide show called "An Inconvenient Horror-The Animal Conspiracy," in an effort to alert the nation to the true terrorists that face our great nation.  Tim is a University of Wisconsin–Stevens Point graduate (cum laude).

External links
Tim Bedore's homepage
Bob and Tom Official Website

American male comedians
21st-century American comedians
University of Wisconsin–Stevens Point alumni
Living people
Year of birth missing (living people)